Minnie's Boys is a musical with a book by Arthur Marx (Groucho Marx's son) and Robert Fisher, music by Larry Grossman, and lyrics by Hal Hackady.

It provides a behind-the-scenes look at the early days of the Marx Brothers and their relationship with their mother Minnie Marx, the driving force behind their ultimate success.

Production
There was a long preview period lasting for sixty-four performances, during which the creators constantly tinkered with the troubled show. The original choreographer, Patricia Birch, was replaced and "...there were rumors about replacing Shelley Winters..." The musical had mixed to negative reviews, "although Walter Kerr...enjoyed it."

The musical opened on Broadway at the Imperial Theatre officially on March 26, 1970 and closed on May 30, 1970 after 80 performances. The musical was directed by Stanley Prager and choreographed by Marc Breaux, with scenic design by Peter Wexler, costume design by Donald Brooks and lighting by Jules Fisher.

The cast featured Shelley Winters as Minnie Marx, Lewis J. Stadlen as Julius "Groucho" Marx, Daniel Fortus as Adolph "Harpo" Marx, Irwin Pearl as Leonard "Chico" Marx, Alvin Kupperman as Herbert "Zeppo" Marx, and Gary Raucher as Milton "Gummo" Marx. Stadlen won both the 1970 Theatre World Award and 1970 Drama Desk Award for Outstanding Performance in a Musical.

The score's song "Mama, a Rainbow" has become a standard for cabaret performers, and was recorded by Steve Lawrence and Jim Nabors soon after the show opened. In the show the song is performed by Harpo, whose screen and stage persona was always silent.

An original cast album was released by Project Three Records, although the cast album was originally scheduled to be recorded and released by RCA Victor.

Groucho Marx received a playbill credit as the show's advisor; after the show closed, it was revealed that Groucho had made no real contributions, and had basically been paid off so that he would not raise any legal objections to the production.

During its brief run, Groucho did help promote the musical by appearing on the Dick Cavett Show with Shelley Winters and the five young actors who portrayed the Marx boys in the show.

The show received a 2008 revival staging under the direction of Stuart Ross at Off-Broadway's York Theatre Company. The cast included Erik Liberman, Pamela Myers, Jim Walton, Dan Bogart, Ryan Duncan, Nick Gaswirth, Beth Glover, Don Mayo, Nancy McCall, Emily Shoolin, Kelly Sullivan, and Stuart Zagnit.

Casts
Source:

Song list
Source:

Act I
 "Five Growing Boys"—Minnie and Neighbors
 "Rich Is"—Al Shean and The Marx Family
 "More Precious Far"—Julie, Herbie, Adolph, Minnie
 "Four Nightingales"—Julie, Herbie, Adolph
 "Underneath It All"—Maxie and Girls
 "Mama, a Rainbow"—Adolph and Minnie
 "You Don't Have to Do It for Me"—Minnie, Julie, Leonard, Adolph, Herbie
 "If You Wind Me Up"—Minnie, Julie, Herbie, Adolph, Leonard
 "Where Was I When They Passed Out Luck?"—Julie, Herbie, Adolph, Leonard

Act II
 "You Remind Me of You"—Julie and Mrs. McNish
 "Minnie's Boys"—Minnie and Company
 "Be Happy"—Minnie, Adolph, Leonard, Herbie, Miltie
 "The Act"—Julie, Herbie, Adolph, Leonard, Minnie
 "Finale"—Company

Cut prior to opening
 "Empty"—Frenchie
 "Guess Where I'm Going"
 "Stage Door Johnny"—Girls
 "The Smell of Christmas"—Julie, Leo, Herbie, Adolph
 "They Give Me Love"—Minnie
 "You're Getting Younger Every Day"—Minnie and Frenchie
 "I'll Say She Is"

Added to later productions
 "Philadelphia"—Minnie

References

External links
Minnie's Boys at the Internet Broadway Database
Roger Ebert interviews Groucho Marx about Minnie's Boys 

1970 musicals
Broadway musicals
Cultural depictions of the Marx Brothers